In mathematics, especially in the group theoretic area of algebra, the projective linear group (also known as the projective general linear group or PGL) is the induced action of the general linear group of a vector space V on the associated projective space P(V). Explicitly, the projective linear group is the quotient group
PGL(V) = GL(V)/Z(V)
where GL(V) is the general linear group of V and Z(V) is the subgroup of all nonzero scalar transformations of V; these are quotiented out because they act trivially on the projective space and they form the kernel of the action, and the notation "Z" reflects that the scalar transformations form the center of the general linear group.

The projective special linear group, PSL, is defined analogously, as the induced action of the special linear group on the associated projective space. Explicitly:
PSL(V) = SL(V)/SZ(V)
where SL(V) is the special linear group over V and SZ(V) is the subgroup of scalar transformations with unit determinant. Here SZ is the center of SL, and is naturally identified with the group of nth roots of unity in F (where n is the dimension of V and F is the base field).

PGL and PSL are some of the fundamental groups of study, part of the so-called classical groups, and an element of PGL is called  projective linear transformation, projective transformation or homography.

PGL and PSL can also be defined over a ring, with an important example being the modular group, .

Name
The name comes from projective geometry, where the projective group acting on homogeneous coordinates (x0:x1: ... :xn) is the underlying group of the geometry. Stated differently, the natural action of GL(V) on V descends to an action of PGL(V) on the projective space P(V).

The projective linear groups therefore generalise the case PGL(2, C) of Möbius transformations (sometimes called the Möbius group), which acts on the projective line.

Note that unlike the general linear group, which is generally defined axiomatically as "invertible functions preserving the linear (vector space) structure", the projective linear group is defined constructively, as a quotient of the general linear group of the associated vector space, rather than axiomatically as "invertible functions preserving the projective linear structure". This is reflected in the notation: PGL(n, F) is the group associated to GL(n, F), and is the projective linear group of (n−1)-dimensional projective space, not n-dimensional projective space.

Collineations

A related group is the collineation group, which is defined axiomatically. A collineation is an invertible (or more generally one-to-one) map which sends collinear points to collinear points. One can define a projective space axiomatically in terms of an incidence structure (a set of points P, lines L, and an incidence relation I specifying which points lie on which lines) satisfying certain axioms – an automorphism of a projective space thus defined then being an automorphism f of the set of points and an automorphism g of the set of lines, preserving the incidence relation, which is exactly a collineation of a space to itself. Projective linear transforms are collineations (planes in a vector space correspond to lines in the associated projective space, and linear transforms map planes to planes, so projective linear transforms map lines to lines), but in general not all collineations are projective linear transforms – PGL is in general a proper subgroup of the collineation group.

Specifically, for n = 2 (a projective line), all points are collinear, so the collineation group is exactly the symmetric group of the points of the projective line, and except for F2 and F3 (where PGL is the full symmetric group), PGL is a proper subgroup of the full symmetric group on these points.

For n ≥ 3, the collineation group is the projective semilinear group, PΓL – this is PGL, twisted by field automorphisms; formally, PΓL ≅ PGL ⋊ Gal(K/k), where k is the prime field for K; this is the fundamental theorem of projective geometry. Correspondingly, the quotient group PΓL/PGL = Gal(K/k) corresponds to "choices of linear structure", with the identity (base point) being the existing linear structure.

One may also define collineation groups for axiomatically defined projective spaces, where there is no natural notion of a projective linear transform. However, with the exception of the non-Desarguesian planes, all projective spaces are the projectivization of a linear space over a division ring though, as noted above, there are multiple choices of linear structure, namely a torsor over Gal(K/k) (for n ≥ 3).

Elements
The elements of the projective linear group can be understood as  "tilting the plane" along one of the axes, and then projecting to the original plane, and also have dimension n.

A more familiar geometric way to understand the projective transforms is via projective rotations (the elements of PSO(n+1)), which corresponds to the stereographic projection of rotations of the unit hypersphere, and has dimension  Visually, this corresponds to standing at the origin (or placing a camera at the origin), and turning one's angle of view, then projecting onto a flat plane. Rotations in axes perpendicular to the hyperplane preserve the hyperplane and yield a rotation of the hyperplane (an element of SO(n), which has dimension ), while rotations in axes parallel to the hyperplane are proper projective maps, and accounts for the remaining n dimensions.

Properties
 PGL sends collinear points to collinear points (it preserves projective lines), but it is not the full collineation group, which is instead either PΓL (for n > 2) or the full symmetric group for n = 2 (the projective line).
 Every (biregular) algebraic automorphism of a projective space is projective linear. The birational automorphisms form a larger group, the Cremona group.
 PGL acts faithfully on projective space: non-identity elements act non-trivially.
Concretely, the kernel of the action of GL on projective space is exactly the scalar maps, which are quotiented out in PGL.
 PGL acts 2-transitively on projective space.
This is because 2 distinct points in projective space correspond to 2 vectors that do not lie on a single linear space, and hence are linearly independent, and GL acts transitively on k-element sets of linearly independent vectors.
 PGL(2, K) acts sharply 3-transitively on the projective line.
3 arbitrary points are conventionally mapped to [0, 1], [1, 1], [1, 0]; in alternative notation, 0, 1, ∞. In fractional linear transformation notation, the function  maps a ↦ 0, b ↦ 1, c ↦ ∞, and is the unique such map that does so. This is the cross-ratio  – see  for details.
 For n ≥ 3, PGL(n, K) does not act 3-transitively, because it must send 3 collinear points to 3 other collinear points, not an arbitrary set. For n = 2 the space is the projective line, so all points are collinear and this is no restriction.
 PGL(2, K) does not act 4-transitively on the projective line (except for PGL(2, 3), as P1(3) has 3+1=4 points, so 3-transitive implies 4-transitive); the invariant that is preserved is the cross ratio, and this determines where every other point is sent: specifying where 3 points are mapped determines the map. Thus in particular it is not the full collineation group of the projective line (except for F2 and F3).
 PSL(2, q) and PGL(2, q) (for q > 2, and q odd for PSL) are two of the four families of Zassenhaus groups.
 PGL(n, K) is an algebraic group of dimension n2−1 and an open subgroup of the projective space Pn2−1. As defined, the functor PSL(n,K) does not define an algebraic group, or even an fppf sheaf, and its sheafification in the fppf topology is in fact PGL(n,K).
 PSL and PGL are centerless – this is because the diagonal matrices are not only the center, but also the hypercenter (the quotient of a group by its center is not necessarily centerless).

Fractional linear transformations

As for Möbius transformations, the group PGL(2, K) can be interpreted as fractional linear transformations with coefficients in K. Points in the projective line over K correspond to pairs from K2, with two pairs being equivalent when they are proportional. When the second coordinate is non-zero, a point can be represented by [z, 1]. Then when ad– bc ≠ 0, the action of PGL(2, K) is by linear transformation:

In this way successive transformations can be written as right multiplication by such matrices, and matrix multiplication can be used for the group product in PGL(2, K).

Finite fields
The projective special linear groups PSL(n, Fq) for a finite field Fq are often written as PSL(n, q) or Ln(q). They are finite simple groups whenever n is at least 2, with two exceptions: L2(2), which is isomorphic to S3, the symmetric group on 3 letters, and is solvable; and L2(3), which is isomorphic to A4, the alternating group on 4 letters, and is also solvable. These exceptional isomorphisms can be understood as arising from the action on the projective line.

The special linear groups SL(n, q) are thus quasisimple: perfect central extensions of a simple group (unless n = 2 and q = 2 or 3).

History
The groups PSL(2, p) were constructed by Évariste Galois in the 1830s, and were the second family of finite simple groups, after the alternating groups. Galois constructed them as fractional linear transforms, and observed that they were simple except if p was 2 or 3; this is contained in his last letter to Chevalier. In the same letter and attached manuscripts, Galois also constructed the general linear group over a prime field, GL(ν, p), in studying the Galois group of the general equation of degree pν.

The groups PSL(n, q) (general n, general finite field) were then constructed in the classic 1870 text by Camille Jordan, Traité des substitutions et des équations algébriques.

Order
The order of PGL(n, q) is

(qn − 1)(qn − q)(qn − q2) ⋅⋅⋅ (qn − qn−1)/(q − 1) = qn2−1 − O(qn2−3),

The "O" is for big O notation, meaning "terms involving lower order".

Exceptional isomorphisms
In addition to the isomorphisms
L2(2) ≅ S3, L2(3) ≅ A4, and PGL(2, 3) ≅ S4,
there are other exceptional isomorphisms between projective special linear groups and alternating groups (these groups are all simple, as the alternating group over 5 or more letters is simple):

 (see here for a proof)

The isomorphism L2(9) ≅ A6 allows one to see the exotic outer automorphism of A6 in terms of field automorphism and matrix operations. The isomorphism L4(2) ≅ A8 is of interest in the structure of the Mathieu group M24.

The associated extensions SL(n, q) → PSL(n, q) are covering groups of the alternating groups (universal perfect central extensions) for A4, A5, by uniqueness of the universal perfect central extension; for L2(9) ≅ A6, the associated extension is a perfect central extension, but not universal: there is a 3-fold covering group.

The groups over F5 have a number of exceptional isomorphisms:
PSL(2, 5) ≅ A5 ≅ I, the alternating group on five elements, or equivalently the icosahedral group;
PGL(2, 5) ≅ S5, the symmetric group on five elements;
SL(2, 5) ≅ 2 ⋅ A5 ≅ 2I the double cover of the alternating group A5, or equivalently the binary icosahedral group.
They can also be used to give a construction of an exotic map S5 → S6, as described below. Note however that GL(2, 5) is not a double cover of S5, but is rather a 4-fold cover.

A further isomorphism is:
L2(7) ≅ L3(2) is the simple group of order 168, the second-smallest non-abelian simple group, and is not an alternating group; see PSL(2,7).

The above exceptional isomorphisms involving the projective special linear groups are almost all of the exceptional isomorphisms between families of finite simple groups; the only other exceptional isomorphism is PSU(4, 2) ≃ PSp(4, 3), between a projective special unitary group and a projective symplectic group.

Action on projective line
Some of the above maps can be seen directly in terms of the action of PSL and PGL on the associated projective line: PGL(n, q) acts on the projective space Pn−1(q), which has (qn−1)/(q−1) points, and this yields a map from the projective linear group to the symmetric group on (qn−1)/(q−1) points. For n = 2, this is the projective line P1(q) which has (q2−1)/(q−1) = q+1 points, so there is a map PGL(2, q) → Sq+1.

To understand these maps, it is useful to recall these facts:
 The order of PGL(2, q) is

the order of PSL(2, q) either equals this (if the characteristic is 2), or is half this (if the characteristic is not 2).
 The action of the projective linear group on the projective line is sharply 3-transitive (faithful and 3-transitive), so the map is one-to-one and has image a 3-transitive subgroup.
Thus the image is a 3-transitive subgroup of known order, which allows it to be identified. This yields the following maps:
PSL(2, 2) = PGL(2, 2) → S3, of order 6, which is an isomorphism.
 The inverse map (a projective representation of S3) can be realized by the anharmonic group, and more generally yields an embedding S3 → PGL(2, q) for all fields.
PSL(2, 3) < PGL(2, 3) → S4, of orders 12 and 24, the latter of which is an isomorphism, with PSL(2, 3) being the alternating group.
 The anharmonic group gives a partial map in the opposite direction, mapping S3 → PGL(2, 3) as the stabilizer of the point −1.
PSL(2, 4) = PGL(2, 4) → S5, of order 60, yielding the alternating group A5.
PSL(2, 5) < PGL(2, 5) → S6, of orders 60 and 120, which yields an embedding of S5 (respectively, A5) as a transitive subgroup of S6 (respectively, A6). This is an example of an exotic map S5 → S6, and can be used to construct the exceptional outer automorphism of S6. Note that the isomorphism PGL(2, 5) ≅ S5 is not transparent from this presentation: there is no particularly natural set of 5 elements on which PGL(2, 5) acts.

Action on p points
While PSL(n, q) naturally acts on (qn−1)/(q−1) = 1+q+...+qn−1 points, non-trivial actions on fewer points are rarer. Indeed, for PSL(2, p) acts non-trivially on p points if and only if p = 2, 3, 5, 7, or 11; for 2 and 3 the group is not simple, while for 5, 7, and 11, the group is simple – further, it does not act non-trivially on fewer than p points. This was first observed by Évariste Galois in his last letter to Chevalier, 1832.

This can be analyzed as follows; note that for 2 and 3 the action is not faithful (it is a non-trivial quotient, and the PSL group is not simple), while for 5, 7, and 11 the action is faithful (as the group is simple and the action is non-trivial), and yields an embedding into Sp. In all but the last case, PSL(2, 11), it corresponds to an exceptional isomorphism, where the right-most group has an obvious action on p points:
  via the sign map;
  via the quotient by the Klein 4-group;
  To construct such an isomorphism, one needs to consider the group L2(5) as a Galois group of a Galois cover a5: X(5) → X(1) = P1, where X(N) is  a modular curve of level N. This cover is ramified at 12 points. The modular curve X(5) has genus 0 and is isomorphic to a sphere over the field of complex numbers, and then the action of L2(5) on these 12 points becomes the symmetry group of an icosahedron. One then needs to consider the action of the symmetry group of icosahedron on the five associated tetrahedra.
L2(7) ≅ L3(2) which acts on the 1+2+4 = 7 points of the Fano plane (projective plane over F2); this can also be seen as the action on order 2 biplane, which is the complementary Fano plane.
L2(11) is subtler, and elaborated below; it acts on the order 3 biplane.
Further, L2(7) and L2(11) have two inequivalent actions on p points; geometrically this is realized by the action on a biplane, which has p points and p blocks – the action on the points and the action on the blocks are both actions on p points, but not conjugate (they have different point stabilizers); they are instead related by an outer automorphism of the group.

More recently, these last three exceptional actions have been interpreted as an example of the ADE classification: these actions correspond to products (as sets, not as groups) of the groups as A4 × Z/5Z, S4 × Z/7Z, and A5 × Z/11Z, where the groups A4, S4 and A5 are the isometry groups of the Platonic solids, and correspond to E6, E7, and E8 under the McKay correspondence. These three exceptional cases are also realized as the geometries of polyhedra (equivalently, tilings of Riemann surfaces), respectively: the compound of five tetrahedra inside the icosahedron (sphere, genus 0), the order 2 biplane (complementary Fano plane) inside the Klein quartic (genus 3), and the order 3 biplane (Paley biplane) inside the buckyball surface (genus 70).

The action of L2(11) can be seen algebraically as due to an exceptional inclusion  – there are two conjugacy classes of subgroups of L2(11) that are isomorphic to L2(5), each with 11 elements: the action of L2(11) by conjugation on these is an action on 11 points, and, further, the two conjugacy classes are related by an outer automorphism of L2(11). (The same is true for subgroups of L2(7) isomorphic to S4, and this also has a biplane geometry.)

Geometrically, this action can be understood via a biplane geometry, which is defined as follows. A biplane geometry is a symmetric design (a set of points and an equal number of "lines", or rather blocks) such that any set of two points is contained in two lines, while any two lines intersect in two points; this is similar to a finite projective plane, except that rather than two points determining one line (and two lines determining one point), they determine two lines (respectively, points). In this case (the Paley biplane, obtained from the Paley digraph of order 11), the points are the affine line (the finite field) F11, where the first line is defined to be the five non-zero quadratic residues (points which are squares: 1, 3, 4, 5, 9), and the other lines are the affine translates of this (add a constant to all the points). L2(11) is then isomorphic to the subgroup of S11 that preserve this geometry (sends lines to lines), giving a set of 11 points on which it acts – in fact two: the points or the lines, which corresponds to the outer automorphism – while L2(5) is the stabilizer of a given line, or dually of a given point.

More surprisingly, the coset space L2(11)/Z/11Z, which has order 660/11 = 60 (and on which the icosahedral group acts) naturally has the structure of a buckeyball, which is used in the construction of the buckyball surface.

Mathieu groups

The group PSL(3, 4) can be used to construct the Mathieu group M24, one of the sporadic simple groups; in this context, one refers to PSL(3, 4) as M21, though it is not properly a Mathieu group itself. One begins with the projective plane over the field with four elements, which is a Steiner system of type S(2, 5, 21) – meaning that it has 21 points, each line ("block", in Steiner terminology) has 5 points, and any 2 points determine a line – and on which PSL(3, 4) acts. One calls this Steiner system W21 ("W" for Witt), and then expands it to a larger Steiner system W24, expanding the symmetry group along the way: to the projective general linear group PGL(3, 4), then to the projective semilinear group PΓL(3, 4), and finally to the Mathieu group M24.

M24 also contains copies of PSL(2, 11), which is maximal in M22, and PSL(2, 23), which is maximal in M24, and can be used to construct M24.

Hurwitz surfaces

PSL groups arise as Hurwitz groups (automorphism groups of Hurwitz surfaces – algebraic curves of maximal possibly symmetry group). The Hurwitz surface of lowest genus, the Klein quartic (genus 3), has automorphism group isomorphic to PSL(2, 7) (equivalently GL(3, 2)), while the Hurwitz surface of second-lowest genus, the Macbeath surface (genus 7), has automorphism group isomorphic to PSL(2, 8).

In fact, many but not all simple groups arise as Hurwitz groups (including the monster group, though not all alternating groups or sporadic groups), though PSL is notable for including the smallest such groups.

Modular group

The groups PSL(2, Z/nZ) arise in studying the modular group, PSL(2, Z), as quotients by reducing all elements mod n; the kernels are called the principal congruence subgroups.

A noteworthy subgroup of the projective general linear group PGL(2, Z) (and of the projective special linear group PSL(2, Z[i])) is the symmetries of the set {0, 1, ∞} ⊂ P1(C) which is known as the anharmonic group, and arises as the symmetries of the six cross-ratios. The subgroup can be expressed as fractional linear transformations, or represented (non-uniquely) by matrices, as:
{| class="wikitable"
|-
| align="center" | 
| align="center" | 
| align="center" | 
|-
| align="center" | 
| align="center" | 
| align="center" | 
|-
| colspan="3" |
|-
| align="center" | 
| align="center" | 
| align="center" | 
|-
| align="center" |
| align="center" |
| align="center" |
|-
| align="center" |
| align="center" |
| align="center" |
|}
Note that the top row is the identity and the two 3-cycles, and are orientation-preserving, forming a subgroup in PSL(2, Z), while the bottom row is the three 2-cycles, and are in PGL(2, Z) and PSL(2, Z[i]), but not in PSL(2, Z), hence realized either as matrices with determinant −1 and integer coefficients, or as matrices with determinant 1 and Gaussian integer coefficients.

This maps to the symmetries of {0, 1, ∞} ⊂ P1(n) under reduction mod n. Notably, for n = 2, this subgroup maps isomorphically to PGL(2, Z/2Z) = PSL(2, Z/2Z) ≅ S3, and thus provides a splitting  for the quotient map 

The 2-cycles interchange these, as they do any points other than their fixed points, which realizes the quotient map S3 → S2 by the group action on these two points. That is, the subgroup C3 < S3 consisting of the identity and the 3-cycles, {(), (0 1 ∞), (0 ∞ 1)}, fixes these two points, while the other elements interchange them.

The fixed points of the individual 2-cycles are, respectively, −1, 1/2, 2, and this set is also preserved and permuted by the 3-cycles. This corresponds to the action of S3 on the 2-cycles (its Sylow 2-subgroups) by conjugation and realizes the isomorphism with the group of inner automorphisms, 

Geometrically, this can be visualized as the rotation group of the triangular bipyramid, which is isomorphic to the dihedral group of the triangle ; see anharmonic group.

Topology 
Over the real and complex numbers, the topology of PGL and PSL can be determined from the fiber bundles that define them:

via the long exact sequence of a fibration.

For both the reals and complexes, SL is a covering space of PSL, with number of sheets equal to the number of nth roots in K; thus in particular all their higher homotopy groups agree. For the reals, SL is a 2-fold cover of PSL for n even, and is a 1-fold cover for n odd, i.e., an isomorphism:
{±1} → SL(2n, R) → PSL(2n, R)

For the complexes, SL is an n-fold cover of PSL.

For PGL, for the reals, the fiber is R* ≅ {±1}, so up to homotopy, GL → PGL is a 2-fold covering space, and all higher homotopy groups agree.

For PGL over the complexes, the fiber is C* ≅ S1, so up to homotopy, GL → PGL is a circle bundle. The higher homotopy groups of the circle vanish, so the homotopy groups of GL(n, C) and PGL(n, C) agree for n ≥ 3. In fact, π2 always vanishes for Lie groups, so the homotopy groups agree for n ≥ 2. For n = 1, we have that π1(GL(n, C)) = π1(S1) = Z. The fundamental group of PGL(2, C) is a finite cyclic group of order 2.

Covering groups 
Conversely, its universal covering group is the maximal (simply connected) element, and the intermediary realizations form a lattice of covering groups.

For example, SL(2, R) has center {±1} and fundamental group Z, and thus has universal cover  and covers the centerless PSL(2, R).

Representation theory

A group homomorphism G → PGL(V) from a group G to a projective linear group is called a projective representation of the group G, by analogy with a linear representation (a homomorphism G → GL(V)). These were studied by Issai Schur, who showed that projective representations of G can be classified in terms of linear representations of central extensions of G. This led to the Schur multiplier, which is used to address this question.

Low dimensions
The projective linear group is mostly studied for n ≥ 2, though it can be defined for low dimensions.

For n = 0 (or in fact n < 0) the projective space of K0 is empty, as there are no 1-dimensional subspaces of a 0-dimensional space. Thus, PGL(0, K) is the trivial group, consisting of the unique empty map from the empty set to itself. Further, the action of scalars on a 0-dimensional space is trivial, so the map K* → GL(0, K) is trivial, rather than an inclusion as it is in higher dimensions.

For n = 1, the projective space of K1 is a single point, as there is a single 1-dimensional subspace. Thus, PGL(1, K) is the trivial group, consisting of the unique map from a singleton set to itself. Further, the general linear group of a 1-dimensional space is exactly the scalars, so the map  is an isomorphism, corresponding to PGL(1, K) := GL(1, K)/K* ≅ {1} being trivial.

For n = 2, PGL(2, K) is non-trivial, but is unusual in that it is 3-transitive, unlike higher dimensions when it is only 2-transitive.

Examples
PSL(2,7)
Modular group, PSL(2, Z)
PSL(2,R)
Möbius group, PGL(2, C) = PSL(2, C)

Subgroups
Projective orthogonal group, PO – maximal compact subgroup of PGL
Projective unitary group, PU
Projective special orthogonal group, PSO – maximal compact subgroup of PSL
Projective special unitary group, PSU

Larger groups
The projective linear group is contained within larger groups, notably:
Projective semilinear group, PΓL, which allows field automorphisms.
Cremona group, Cr(Pn(k)) of birational automorphisms; any biregular automorphism is linear, so PGL coincides with the group of biregular automorphisms.

See also
Projective transformation
Unit

Notes

References

Lie groups
Projective geometry

de:Allgemeine lineare Gruppe#Projektive lineare Gruppe